The Economic Affairs Committee is a select committee of the House of Lords in the Parliament of the United Kingdom. It has a broad remit "to consider economic affairs and business affairs".

Membership
As of May 2022, the membership of the committee is as follows:

Sub-committee
The Finance Bill Sub-Committee is a sub-committee of the Economic Affairs Committee. It was first appointed in September 2018 and has a remit to consider the Finance Bill.

Membership
As of July 2022, the members of the committee are:

References

External links
Economic Affairs Committee
The records of the House of Lords Economic Affairs Committee are held by the UK Parliamentary Archives
The records of the House of Lords Economic Affairs Finance Bill Sub-Committee are held by the UK Parliamentary Archives

Committees of the House of Lords